Michelle Angelina Materre (May 12, 1954 – March 11, 2022) was an American educator and film distributor. She was an early proponent of independent films by Black female directors.

Materre was appointed associate professor at The New School in 2000 and ran media studies courses.

References

External links
https://www.imdb.com/name/nm2561614/

1954 births
2022 deaths
20th-century African-American women
20th-century African-American people
21st-century African-American women
20th-century African-American educators
21st-century African-American educators
American women in film
The New School faculty